The Necklace of Precious Pearls is one of the Seventeen tantras of Dzogchen Upadesha.

Translations
The tantra has been translated into English by Christopher Wilkinson in a self-published edition entitled "The Pearl Necklace Tantra: Upadesha Instructions of the Great Perfection"

Primary resources
mu tig rin po che phreng ba'i rgyud @ Wikisource in Wylie
མུ་ཏིག་རིན་པོ་ཆེ་ཕྲེང་བའི་རྒྱུད @ Wikisource in Uchen (Tibetan Script), Unicode

Notes

Dzogchen texts
Nyingma tantras